Eshqabad (also Romanized as ‘Eshqābād and ‘Ishqābād) is a city in Miyan Jolgeh District, in Nishapur County, Razavi Khorasan Province, Iran. At the 2006 census, its population was 1,325, in 348 families.

References 

Populated places in Nishapur County
Cities in Razavi Khorasan Province